Drain were an American noise rock band formed in Austin, Texas by King Coffey in 1991. The group also included David McCreath on guitar and bassist Owen McMahon of Cherubs. Along with the psychedelic leanings of Coffey's other band the Butthole Surfers, Drain also ventures into electronic and techno music territory. Also, samplers and drum machines play a stronger role in the music.

Discography 
"A Black Fist" b/w "Flower Mound" (1991)
Pick Up Heaven (1992)
Offspeed and In There (1996)

References

External links 
 
 

American noise rock music groups
Musical groups from Austin, Texas
Psychedelic rock music groups from Texas
American experimental rock groups
Musical groups established in 1992
Musical groups disestablished in 1997
American musical trios
Trance Syndicate artists
1992 establishments in Texas